Abba Are the enemy is the debut album by Tom Hingley and the Lovers, which features Inspiral Carpets singer Tom Hingley, Steve Hanley and Paul Hanley from Manchester punk band The Fall. It was released in 2004. The album was given a six out of ten rating by PopMatters, with reviewer John Bergstrom calling "Online Pharmacy" as a "Hendrix redux", and stating that Hingley sounds "like the bastard child of Paul Weller and Roger Daltrey".

Track listing 
All Songs written by Tom Hingley, Steve Hanley, Paul Hanley, Kelly Wood, James Brown, except "Hole" written by Tom Hingley. Lyrics on "No Way Out" by Kelly Wood.

Personnel
Tom Hingley and the Lovers
Tom Hingley - vocals, guitar
Steve Hanley - bass, backing vocals
Paul Hanley - drums, backing vocals
Jason Brown - guitar, backing vocals
Kelly Wood - Farfisa keyboard, melodica, synthesiser, vibraphone, backing vocals

References

External links
The Lovers Official site
The Lovers at Myspace
Online Pharmacy- Video 
The Lovers at Discogs

2004 debut albums
Tom Hingley and the Lovers albums